Rose Eleanor Arbuthnot-Leslie (born 9 February 1987) is a Scottish actress. She is known for her roles as Gwen Dawson in the ITV drama series Downton Abbey and Ygritte in the HBO fantasy series Game of Thrones, as well as playing Maia Rindell in three seasons of the CBS All Access legal and political drama The Good Fight and starring as Clare Abshire in HBO's The Time Traveler's Wife.

Early life and ancestry
Leslie was born in Aberdeen, Scotland, and raised at Lickleyhead Castle in Aberdeenshire, her family's 15th-century ancestral seat, where she lived until the age of 10. Her father, Sebastian Arbuthnot-Leslie, is the Chieftain of the Aberdeenshire branch of the Scottish Clan Leslie. Her mother is Candida Mary Sibyl "Candy" Leslie (née Weld) of Clan Fraser of Lovat, whose maternal great-grandfather was Simon Fraser, 13th Lord Lovat and a descendant of King Charles II. Through her mother, Leslie is a great-great-granddaughter of Frederick Weld, the sixth prime minister of New Zealand and, through her father, she is a great-great-granddaughter of Don Guillermo Landa y Escandón, who served as governor of Mexico City. Leslie's ancestors include Ambrose Lisle March Phillipps De Lisle, politician Charles March-Phillipps and MP James Grimston, 3rd Earl of Verulam. Her family currently lives at the 12th-century Wardhill Castle in Old Rayne.

She was first educated at Rayne North School in Aberdeenshire. At 10, she went to Ermitage International School in Maisons-Laffitte, France, where her family lived for 3 years. Upon their return to the UK, she was sent to Millfield, a boarding school in Street, Somerset, before spending three years at the London Academy of Music and Dramatic Art. She won a BASSC certificate in stage combat and graduated with a Bachelor of Arts with Honours in 2008.

Career
Leslie worked for BBC Radio narrating The British Slave Trade: Abolition, Parliament and People.

Her leading on screen debut came at age 21 in the television film New Town (2009), for which she won the Scottish BAFTA for Best Acting Performance – New Talent Award.

In September and October 2010, she became the lead in Nell Leyshon's play Bedlam at the Globe Theatre. Based on the Bethlem Royal Hospital, representative of the worst excesses of asylums in the era of lunacy reform, Leslie portrayed May, a beautiful country girl driven mad by lost love. The Daily Telegraphs Charles Spencer praised her performance, commenting, "Leslie proves genuinely poignant." Her break-through role came as Gwen Dawson, a housemaid, in the first series (2010–11) of the ITV television drama Downton Abbey. In 2011, while on Downton Abbey, Leslie briefly appeared in two episodes of the British drama series Case Histories.

In 2012, she was cast in seasons two, three and four of the popular HBO fantasy series Game of Thrones as the wildling Ygritte. The A.V. Clubs Rowan Kaiser stated: "As Ygritte, [Rose] is both dangerous and flirtatious, and it's fun to watch." Den of Geek's David Crow exclaimed, "A complicated character [...] Rose Leslie devours the screen." In 2013, Vox.com's Emily VanDerWerff (under The A.V. Club) review for "The Climb" episode, "(In the books) Ygritte is a means to an end... (but) on screen, as embodied by Rose Leslie, she becomes something more," whilst The Atlantics Christopher Orr summed up her portrayal in the 2014 episode "The Watchers of the Wall" by concluding: "Rose Leslie has been one of a handful of performers on the show who’ve really elevated their characters above what they were in the books."

While on Game of Thrones, Leslie appeared in the 2012 drama film Now Is Good and in episodes of ITV detective television series Vera, Channel 4 conspiracy drama Utopia and BBC One's comedy series Blandings.

From October to November 2014, she appeared in the four-part mini-series The Great Fire. She then starred in the horror film Honeymoon. She has since played DS Emma Lane in the BBC detective drama Luther with positive response and starred in the 2015 action adventure/fantasy film The Last Witch Hunter.

She and David Tennant recorded an audiobook version of Carmilla in 2015. In 2016, she portrayed the character of Athena in Sticky Notes.

In 2016, Leslie was cast in The Good Fight, a CBS All Access legal drama and spin off of The Good Wife. She plays Maia Rindell, a young lawyer who just passed the bar exam and whose family is involved in a financial scam, destroying her reputation. The first episode aired in February 2017. In July 2019, it was revealed that Leslie would not return for the show's fourth season.

In 2017 Leslie provided the voice for the female protagonist "En" in the video game Echo, a game by Copenhagen-based game developer Ultra Ultra.

In October 2019 Leslie was cast as Louise Bourget in Kenneth Branagh's adaptation of Agatha Christie's novel Death on The Nile. The film was released on 11 February 2022.

In January 2020, Leslie joined the cast of BBC's and World Productions's drama series Vigil, which premiered in 2021.

In February 2021, Leslie was cast in HBO's The Time Traveler's Wife TV series based on the novel by Audrey Niffenegger, starring as Clare Abshire alongside Theo James as Henry DeTamble.

Personal life
Leslie became fluent in French while living with her family in France during her pre-adolescent years. While working as an actress, she lived in Battersea, London, until moving to North London. She often refers to missing Aberdeen, saying "I feel very much at peace in Scotland."

In 2011, Leslie began dating Kit Harington, who later played her love interest, Jon Snow, in Game of Thrones. They married on 23 June 2018. In September 2020, Leslie posed for a magazine photo shoot visibly pregnant. Their son was born in January 2021. In February 2023, it became known that Kit Harington and Rose Leslie are expecting their second child.

Politics and other interests
Leslie supported Scotland remaining as part of the United Kingdom during the 2014 Scottish independence referendum campaign. At the 2015 UK general election, she campaigned with the Conservatives in her local constituency of Gordon.

She sees herself as a runner and enjoys rock climbing, cooking, skiing, archery, and tennis. 

She is a patron of the charity Firefly International.

Filmography

Film

Television

Video game

Theatre

Awards and nominations

Notes

References

External links

 
 

Living people
1987 births
21st-century Scottish actresses
Actresses from Aberdeen
Alumni of the London Academy of Music and Dramatic Art
BAFTA winners (people)
British actors of Latin American descent
British people of Mexican descent
Rose
Conservative Party (UK) people
People educated at Millfield
Scottish film actresses
Scottish radio actresses
Scottish stage actresses
Scottish television actresses
Scottish video game actresses
Scottish voice actresses